Lu Jian (born 4 October 1972) is a Chinese host and anchorman.

He won the Golden Mike Award in 2010.

Biography
Lu was born in Alxa League, Inner Mongolia in October 1972, he has an elder sister. At the age of 15, his father died of cerebral thrombosis.

After graduating from Communication University of China in 2001 he was assigned to China Central Television. On March 20, 2003, Lu Jian became the first Chinese television announcer to announce the beginning of Iraq War, only one minute after CNN's first report.

Works

Television
 China News
 Focus on 
 News 60 Minutes
 Business News

Awards
 2010 Golden Mike Award

Personal life
Lu married his colleague Zheng Tianliang in Beijing on March 6, 2004, who is also a host in China Central Television, the couple has a daughter.

References

External links

1972 births
People from Alxa League
Communication University of China alumni
Living people